Saint Étienne is French for Saint Stephen.

Saint Etienne may also refer to:

Places

Jerusalem 
St. Stephen's Basilica, Jerusalem, in French Saint-Étienne, traditional place of St Stephen's martyrdom; modern church over ruins of Byzantine 5th-century predecessor

Canada 
Saint-Étienne-de-Beauharnois, Quebec
Saint-Étienne-de-Bolton, Quebec
Saint-Étienne-des-Grès, Quebec
Saint-Étienne-de-Lauzon, Quebec
 See: Saint-Étienne, Quebec (disambiguation)

France 
St Étienne Cathedral, the cathedral of Toulouse
St Étienne of the Mountain, a church in Paris
St Étienne Church, Troyes, a former collegiate church
St Étienne Church, Vignory
St Étienne Temple, the main Protestant church of Mulhouse
The Men's Abbey, also known as St Étienne of Caen, a former abbey in Caen

 Communes
Saint-Étienne, in the Loire department
Saint-Étienne-à-Arnes, in the Ardennes department
Saint-Étienne-au-Mont, in the Pas-de-Calais department
Saint-Étienne-au-Temple, in the Marne department
Saint-Étienne-aux-Clos, in the Corrèze department
Saint-Étienne-Cantalès, in the Cantal department
Saint-Étienne-d'Albagnan, in the Hérault department
Saint-Étienne-de-Baïgorry, in the Pyrénées-Atlantiques department
Saint-Étienne-de-Boulogne, in the Ardèche department
Saint-Étienne-de-Brillouet, in the Vendée department
Saint-Étienne-de-Carlat, in the Cantal department
Saint-Étienne-de-Chigny, in the Indre-et-Loire department
Saint-Étienne-de-Chomeil, in the Cantal department
Saint-Étienne-de-Crossey, in the Isère department
Saint-Étienne-de-Cuines, in the Savoie department
Saint-Étienne-de-Fontbellon, in the Ardèche department
Saint-Étienne-de-Fougères, in the Lot-et-Garonne department
Saint-Étienne-de-Fursac, in the Creuse department
Saint-Étienne-de-Gourgas, in the Hérault department
Saint-Étienne-de-Lisse, in the Gironde department
Saint-Étienne-de-l'Olm, in the Gard department
Saint-Étienne-de-Lugdarès, in the Ardèche department
Saint-Étienne-de-Maurs, in the Cantal department
Saint-Étienne-de-Mer-Morte, in the Loire-Atlantique department
Saint-Étienne-de-Montluc, in the Loire-Atlantique department
Saint-Étienne-de-Puycorbier, in the Dordogne department
Saint-Étienne-de-Saint-Geoirs, in the Isère department
Saint-Étienne-des-Champs, in the Puy-de-Dôme department
Saint-Étienne-de-Serre, in the Ardèche department
Saint-Étienne-des-Guérets, in the Loir-et-Cher department
Saint-Étienne-des-Oullières, in the Rhône department
Saint-Étienne-des-Sorts, in the Gard department
Saint-Étienne-de-Tinée, in the Alpes-Maritimes department
Saint-Étienne-de-Tulmont, in the Tarn-et-Garonne department
Saint-Étienne-de-Valoux, in the Ardèche department
Saint-Étienne-de-Vicq, in the Allier department
Saint-Étienne-de-Villeréal, in the Lot-et-Garonne department
Saint-Étienne-d'Orthe, in the Landes department
Saint-Étienne-du-Bois, Ain, in the Ain department
Saint-Étienne-du-Bois, Vendée, in the Vendée department
Saint-Étienne-du-Grès, in the Bouches-du-Rhône department
Saint-Étienne-du-Gué-de-l'Isle, in the Côtes-d'Armor department
Saint-Étienne-du-Rouvray, in the Seine-Maritime department
Saint-Étienne-du-Valdonnez, in the Lozère department
Saint-Étienne-du-Vauvray, in the Eure department
Saint-Étienne-du-Vigan, in the Haute-Loire department
Saint-Étienne-en-Bresse, in the Saône-et-Loire department
Saint-Étienne-en-Coglès, in the Ille-et-Vilaine department
Saint-Étienne-en-Dévoluy, in the Hautes-Alpes department
Saint-Étienne-Estréchoux, in the Hérault department
Saint-Étienne-la-Cigogne, in the Deux-Sèvres department
Saint-Étienne-la-Geneste, in the Corrèze department
Saint-Étienne-l'Allier, in the Eure department
Saint-Étienne-Lardeyrol, in the Haute-Loire department
Saint-Étienne-la-Thillaye, in the Calvados department
Saint-Étienne-la-Varenne, in the Rhône department
Saint-Étienne-le-Laus, in the Hautes-Alpes department
Saint-Étienne-le-Molard, in the Loire department
Saint-Étienne-les-Orgues, in the Alpes-de-Haute-Provence department
Saint-Étienne-lès-Remiremont, in the Vosges department
Saint-Étienne-Roilaye, in the Oise department
Saint-Étienne-sous-Bailleul, in the Eure department
Saint-Étienne-sous-Barbuise, in the Aube department
Saint-Étienne-sur-Blesle, in the Haute-Loire department
Saint-Étienne-sur-Chalaronne, in the Ain department
Saint-Étienne-sur-Reyssouze, in the Ain department
Saint-Étienne-sur-Suippe, in the Marne department
Saint-Étienne-sur-Usson, in the Puy-de-Dôme department
Saint-Étienne-Vallée-Française, in the Lozère department

Rivers

Rivière du Mont Saint-Étienne, tributary of the Sainte-Anne river, flowing on the north bank of the Saint Lawrence
Saint-Étienne River (Saguenay River tributary), Quebec, Canada
Rivière Saint-Étienne (Réunion)

Other 
Saint Etienne (band), an English indie dance band
AS Saint-Étienne, a French association football team from the eponymous commune
Jean-Paul Rabaut Saint-Étienne, French revolutionary
"St. Etienne", a song on the album Jazz from Hell by Frank Zappa
"Fields of St Etienne", a song performed by Mary Hopkin, written by Gallagher and Lyle
St. Étienne Mle 1907, a French machine gun used in World War I

See also 
 Étienne (disambiguation)